Parodia columnaris is a species of cactus in the subfamily Cactoideae. It is endemic to Bolivia. It was described in 1951 by Martín Cárdenas.

References

columnaris
Cacti of South America
Endemic flora of Bolivia
Near threatened flora of South America
Plants described in 1951